Rethabile Nomalanga Khumalo (born ), is a South African singer-songwriter mononymously known as Rethabile. She rose to fame after being featured on a single "Umlilo" by DJ Zinhle, which has been dubbed 3× platinum by RISA with over 9 million YouTube video views.
Rethabile Khumalo was declared a platinum selling musician after her hit single 'Ntyilo Ntyilo' became platinum in August 2021.

Life and career

Early life
Rethabile Khumalo as born on 6 September 1996. Her mother, Winnie Khumalo, is a South African singer.

Career
In 2012, Rethabile auditioned on Idols South Africa  at the age of 16 and got eliminated. In 2018, she signed a record deal with Afrotaiment, and released her single "Nomathemba" in September 2018. In August 2019, she was featured on DJ Zinhle single "Umlilo" in collaboration with or rather produced by Mvzzle, after successful collaboration with Zinhle, she released her single "Ntyilo Ntyilo"  featuring South African DJ Master KG. The song was certified platinum by the Recording Industry of South Africa. "Ntyilo Ntyilo" won Most Voted Song at 6th Mzansi Kwaito and House Music Awards.

In September 2020, her debut studio album Like Mother, Like Daughter was released.

Discography
Like Mother Like Daughter (2020)
The Legacy EP (2022)

Filmography

Television

Awards and nominations

References

External links
 

South African musicians
Amapiano musicians
1996 births
Living people
People from Gauteng
South African singers
Zulu people
21st-century South African musicians